"Pregnant Again" is a song written by Lee Pockriss and Mark Sameth that was originally performed by American country music artist Loretta Lynn. It was released as a single in January 1980 via MCA Records.

Background and reception 
"Pregnant Again" was recorded at the Bradley's Barn in October 1979. Located in Mount Juliet, Tennessee, the session was produced by renowned country music producer Owen Bradley. Two additional tracks were recorded during this session, including Lynn's next single "Naked in the Rain".

"Pregnant Again" reached number thirty on the Billboard Hot Country Singles survey in 1980, becoming her first single to miss the top-twenty in many years. Additionally, the song peaked at number thirteen on the Canadian RPM Country Songs chart during this same period. It was included on her studio album, Loretta (1979).

Track listings 
7" vinyl single
 "Pregnant Again" – 3:35
 "You're a Cross I Can't Bear"

Charts

References 

1980 songs
1980 singles
MCA Records singles
Loretta Lynn songs
Songs written by Lee Pockriss
Song recordings produced by Owen Bradley